Flérida Lamarche de Nolasco (Flérida María Lamarche Henríquez; born in Santo Domingo on 27 February 1891; died 12 February 1976) was a scholar and literary critic, renowned pianist, historian, and teacher of the Dominican Republic. She is noted for her musical interest.

Her father, Manuel Lamarche, was of French descent, and her mother, Clotilde Henríquez y Carvajal, had Sephardic Dutch-Jewish ancestry. She married her cousin Sócrates Nolasco.

Works 
Cultura Musical, 1927
De música española y otros temas, 1939
La música en Santo Domingo y otros Ensayos, 1939
La Poesía Folklórica en Santo Domingo, 1946
Existencia y Vicisitudes del Colegio Gorjón, 1947
Cuadros del Evangelio, 1947
Vibraciones en el Tiempo, 1948, 1972
Días de la Colonia, 1952
Rutas de Nuestra Poesía, 1952
Santo Domingo en el Folklore Universal, 1957
Grandes Momentos de la Historia de la Música, 1957
Santa Teresa de Jesús a través de sus Obras, 1959
El primer santuario de América, 1961
Pedro Henríquez Ureña, Síntesis de su pensamiento, 1966
Clamor de Justicia en la Española, 1502-1795, 1971
Luminarias en Vela, 1972
Mi Testimonio, 1975

References 

People from Santo Domingo
20th-century Dominican Republic historians
Dominican Republic people of French descent
Dominican Republic people of Dutch-Jewish descent
Dominican Republic pianists
Dominican Republic educators
Dominican Republic women writers
Dominican Republic people of Spanish descent
White Dominicans
1891 births
1976 deaths